Sirius Red F 3B (Direct Red 80) is an azo dye primarily used in staining methods for collagen and amyloid. It has the molecular formula C45H26N10Na6O21S6.

In histology, sirius red staining is used in various domains of diagnostic to observe fibrosis levels in a lot of cases of inflammation induced by cancer, vascular or metabolic pathologies.

In bright field microscopy the following can be observed:

 The nuclei in yellow
 The cytoplasm in yellow
 Collagen fibers in red
 Muscular fibers in yellow
 Red blood cells in yellow

See also
Collagen Hybridizing Peptide, a peptide that stains denatured collagen in tissues

References 

Staining dyes
Azo dyes